The following is a list of the national roads in Rwanda, which are under the jurisdiction of the Rwanda Transport Development Agency. The list is not exhaustive.

National roads

See also
 Economy of Rwanda
 Transport in Rwanda

References

External links
 Website of RTDA

Roads in Rwanda
Rwanda
Roads
Roads